Stefan Semchyshyn (born 1940) is a professional obstetrician and gynecologist, and a maternal–fetal medicine specialist. He is the author of How to Prevent Miscarriage and Other Crises of Pregnancy.

After completing his studies, he started his career as a doctor of medicine. He supervised high risk deliveries; during his tenure, he was involved in over 3000 deliveries, with a 97.5 percent success rate in bringing high-risk pregnancies to term.

Bibliography
 How to Prevent Miscarriage and Other Crises of Pregnancy, 1989 – publisher Macmillan Publishers, New York City

References

1940 births
Living people
20th-century American businesspeople
20th-century American non-fiction writers
American book publishers (people)
American self-help writers
People from Jonesborough, Tennessee